Isolotto della Maddalena Lighthouse is an active lighthouse located on a small islet,  long, placed  north of the south mole of the Port of Alghero on the Sea of Sardinia.

Description
The lighthouse is completely automated, powered by a solar unit, and managed by the Marina Militare with the identification code number 1415 E.F.

See also
 List of lighthouses in Italy

References

External links

 Servizio Fari Marina Militare

Lighthouses in Italy